Coștangalia is a village in Cantemir District, Moldova.

The battle of Coștangalia took place here on 15 July 1863.

References

Villages of Cantemir District